Robert G. Trocolor (March 31, 1917 – July 27, 1984) was an American football player and coach. He was also a college basketball and football head coach as well as movie actor.

Football career

Player
Trocolor played college football for the Long Island Blackbirds before transferring to play for the Alabama Crimson Tide. He then went undrafted in 1942 but eventually landed a spot with the National Football League's New York Giants, for whom he played for two seasons as a substitute quarterback, punt returner and halfback. In 1944, Trocolor was traded to the Brooklyn Tigers and played in two games. The team merged with the Boston Yanks in 1945, but Trocolor did not get picked up, so his professional football career ended after three seasons.

Coach
In 1974, Trocolor became the third head football coach in William Paterson University Pioneers football program history. He served for just one year and compiled a 2–7 overall record (1–4 conference).

Basketball head coach
Trocolor was chosen as the 12th head coach in Stetson University's men's basketball program history. Similar to his brief stint as a college football coach, he only stayed for one year—the 1949–50 season—before moving on. In his lone season as the Hatters' head coach he compiled a 6–16 record.

Acting
In the 1953 film Big Leaguer, Trocolor plays himself. The movie is about a group of 18- to 22-year-old men who are trying out for a Major League Baseball team, and he is one of the players.

Head coaching record

Football

Basketball

References

External links
 
 

1917 births
1984 deaths
20th-century American male actors
Alabama Crimson Tide football players
Brooklyn Tigers players
Long Island Blackbirds football players
New York Giants players
Stetson Hatters football coaches
Stetson Hatters men's basketball coaches
William Paterson Pioneers football coaches
People from Franklin Lakes, New Jersey
Coaches of American football from New Jersey
Players of American football from New Jersey
Basketball coaches from New Jersey
Male actors from New Jersey